Aleksey Vladimirovich Pluzhnikov (born 15 July 1991) is a Russian volleyball player, a member of the club Gazprom-Ugra Surgut.

Sporting achievements

National Team 
Junior European Championship:
  2010
U21 World Championship:
  2011
Universiade:
  2017

References

External links
YarVolley profile
Volley profile
Volley Service profile
Volleybox profile
FIVB profile
CEV profile

1991 births
Living people
Russian men's volleyball players
Universiade silver medalists for Russia
Universiade medalists in volleyball
Medalists at the 2017 Summer Universiade